Les Sables-d'Olonne (French meaning: "The Sands of Olonne"; Poitevin: Lés Sablles d'Oloune) is a seaside town in Western France, on the Atlantic Ocean. A subprefecture of the department of Vendée, Pays de la Loire, it has the administrative level of commune. On 1 January 2019, the municipalities of Olonne-sur-Mer, Château-d'Olonne and Les Sables-d'Olonne merged, retaining the latter name.

Location and geography

Les Sables-d'Olonne is a seaside town in western France, on the Atlantic Ocean. It is situated on the coast between La Rochelle and Saint-Nazaire, near the coastal terminus of the A87 that connects it and nearby communities to La Roche-sur-Yon, Cholet, and Angers to the northeast. The nearest major metropolitan center of France, to Les Sables-d'Olonne, is Nantes, to the north (approximately 105 km, by road). Les Sables-d'Olonne station has rail connections to Paris, La Roche-sur-Yon and Nantes.

It is at the level of administrative division in the French Republic of a commune and is a sub-prefecture of the Department of Vendée.

Climate

Les Sables-d'Olonne has a oceanic climate (Köppen climate classification Cfb) closely bordering on a warm-summer Mediterranean climate (Csb).

History

Les Sables-d'Olonne is French for "the sands of Olonne".  It was founded in 1218 from Havre d'Olonne by Savary I de Mauléon, the Lord of Mauléon, Sénéchal of Poitou and prince of Talmont. Its history is tied to the ocean for which it has served as a port and point of maritime commerce. Louis XI separated Les Sables d'Olonne from the town of Olonne in 1472. It became the largest cod-fishing port in France, with 14,000 inhabitants, in the 17th century. During the French Revolution, unlike the surrounding Vendée, the city supported the Republic,  and so was often besieged—unsuccessfully, because of its port. The current local tourism industry traces its roots to bathing establishments, first begun in 1825. Rail service reached Les Sables on 29 December 1866, via the line from La Roche-sur-Yon, Bressuire, Saumur, and Tours; express service to and from Paris would arrive in 1971. The city's port served as a base port for American Expeditionary Forces during World War I. Germany occupied Les Sables d'Olonne during World War II and, upon evacuation of that army at war's end, the German army made an effort to destroy the port, and mined the harbor.

Population

The population data in the table and graph below refer to the commune of Les Sables-d'Olonne proper, in its geography at the given years. The populations of Olonne-sur-Mer and Château-d'Olonne, absorbed in 2019, are not included.

Interests and events
The Vendée Globe yacht race, which takes place every four years, starts and ends at Les Sables-d'Olonne.

The Musée de l'Abbaye Sainte-Croix is a municipal museum situated in a 17th-century building that is devoted to modern and contemporary art, and that has "Musée de France" status. It includes works of Gaston Chaissac (1910–1964) and Victor Brauner (1903–1966).

Les Sables-d'Olonne is the setting for 1948 novel , by Georges Simenon.

The town is the birthplace of pirate François l'Olonnais.

Twin towns – sister cities

Les Sables-d'Olonne is twinned with:

Niceville, Florida, United States

 Gourcy, Burkina Faso
 A Laracha, Spain
 Murat, France
 Schwabach, Germany
 Worthing, England, United Kingdom

Gallery

See also
Communes of the Vendée department

References

External links

Official website 
Les Sables-d'Olonne, Vendee Globe Race (in English)
Les Sables-d'Olonne Tourist Board 

Communes of Vendée
Subprefectures in France
Port cities and towns on the French Atlantic coast
Poitou
Vendée communes articles needing translation from French Wikipedia